Hyenas Only Laugh for Fun is the third solo album by singer Roger Chapman and his band The Shortlist. The album was released 1981.

Track listing 
All lyrics by Roger Chapman

Side one
"Prisoner" (Chapman, Tim Hinkley, Geoff Whitehorn) – 5:38
"Hyenas Only Laugh for Fun" (Chapman, Hinkley, Whitehorn, Jerome Rimson) – 3:10
"Killing Time" (Chapman) – 5:35
"Wants Nothing Chained (Chapman, Whitehorn)– 3:00
"The Long Goodbye" (Chapman) – 4:39

Side two
"Blood and Sand" (Chapman, Whitehorn) – 4:55
"Common Touch" (Chapman) – 5:10
"Goodbye Reprise" (Chapman) – 1:10
"Hearts On The Floor" (Chapman) – 4:30
"Step Up – Take A Bow" (Chapman, Whitney) – 3:30
"Jukebox Mama" (Chapman, Troy Seals) – 1:22

Personnel 

Roger Chapman –  Harmonica, vocals
Tim Hinkley – Keyboards
Geoff Whitehorn – Guitars
Steve Simpson – Violin, mandolin, slide guitar
Jerome Rimson – Bass guitar
John Wetton – Bass guitar
Leonard "Stretch" Stretching – Drums
Alan Coulter – Drums
Nick Pentelow – Saxophones
Poli Palmer – Synthesisers, programming
Raymond Burrell – Editing blocks
Duncan Kinnell – Percussion
Jill Mumford - sleeve design

References 

Roger Chapman albums
1980 albums